The Marie Curie Monument in Lublin (Polish: Pomnik Marii Skłodowskiej-Curie w Lublinie) is a bronze statue in Lublin, eastern Poland, dedicated to Polish physicist and chemist Marie Curie (1867–1934).

History
The bronze monument was designed by Polish sculptor Marian Konieczny (with Stanisław Ciechan) and ceremonially unveiled on 24 October 1964. It is 9 metres high (including pedestal) and stands on Marie Skłodowska-Curie Square (Plac Marii Skłodowskiej-Curie), near Maria Curie-Skłodowska University (UMCS). 

Marie Curie is depicted in a long robe and holding a book in her right hand. The pedestal inscriptions read: "To Maria Skłodowska-Curie, from the University Bearing Her Name, and from [Polish] Society" and "On the 20th Anniversary of the Founding of the University. 1944–1964."

Gallery

See also
Maria Konopnicka Monument in Września

References

1964 sculptures
Sculptures of women
Sculptures in Poland
Sculptures of women in Poland
Outdoor sculptures in Poland